Eastern Bank may also refer to;

Eastern Bank Ltd, a former British bank founded in 1909, and acquired by Chartered Bank (now Standard Chartered) in 1957.
 Eastern Bank, a large bank in New England, Massachusetts; founded as Salem Savings Bank in 1818 and renamed to Eastern Bank in 1989. 
 Eastern Bank Ltd (Bangladesh), a bank headquartered in Dhaka, Bangladesh and commenced operation in 1992.

See also
East Bank